Linda Hill-MacDonald (born August 21, 1948) is an American former women's basketball coach.

Career
She was head coach at Fredonia from 2013 to 2018 and at the University at Buffalo from 2005 to 2012.

She was also head coach at Temple University, (1980–90), The University of Minnesota (1990–97), and the WNBA's Cleveland Rockers from 1997 to 1999. She later served as an assistant coach with the Washington Mystics, the University of South Carolina, and retired from coaching in May 2020 while assisting at Canisius.

Originally from Morton, Pennsylvania, Hill-MacDonald has a daughter, Kelli, and a son, Scott, who both reside in the Philadelphia area.

Head coaching record

|-
| align="left" |CLE
| align="left" |1997
|28||15||13||.536|| align="center" |4th in Eastern||-||-||-||-
| align="center" |N/A
|-
| align="left" |CLE
| align="left" |1998
|30||20||10||.667|| align="center" |1st in Eastern||3||1||2||.333
| align="center" |Lost WNBA Semifinals (Phoenix, 1–2)
|-
| align="left" |CLE
| align="left" |1999
|32||7||25||.219|| align="center" |6th in Eastern||-||-||-||-
| align="center" |N/A
|- 
|-class="sortbottom"
| align="left" |Career
| ||90||42||48||.467|| ||3||1||2||.333

Awards and honors
 1989—Carol Eckman Award

References

External links
official bio

1948 births
Living people
American women's basketball coaches
Basketball coaches from Pennsylvania
Buffalo Bulls women's basketball coaches
Cleveland Rockers coaches
Minnesota Golden Gophers women's basketball coaches
Sportspeople from Delaware County, Pennsylvania
Temple Owls women's basketball coaches
West Chester University alumni
21st-century American women
Fredonia Blue Devils